Paul Crummey (born 1997) is an Irish hurler who plays for Dublin Senior Championship club Lucan Sarsfields and at inter-county level with the Dublin senior hurling team. He currently lines out as a wing-forward.

Career

A member of the Lucan Sarsfields club, Crummey first came to prominence on the inter-county scene at underage levels with the Dublin under-21 team. He simultaneously lined out with University College Dublin in the Fitzgibbon Cup. Crummey was added to the Dublin senior hurling team alongside his brother Chris Crummey in 2019.

References

External links
Paul Crummey profile at the Dublin GAA website

1997 births
Living people
Dublin inter-county hurlers
Irish veterinarians
Lucan Sarsfields hurlers